This is a list of aviation-related events from 1959.

Deadliest crash
The deadliest crash of this year was TWA Flight 891, a Lockheed L-1649 Starliner which crashed shortly after takeoff from Milan, Italy on 26 June, killing all 68 people on board.

Events 
 The Canadian Golden Hawks aerobatic team is formed.
 The United States Department of the Navy merges its Bureau of Aeronautics and Bureau of Ordnance to form a new Bureau of Naval Weapons.

January
 Northern Aircraft Inc. becomes the Downer Aircraft Company Inc.
 January 1 – The British government announces its decision to proceed with development of the BAC TSR.2 supersonic tactical strike and reconnaissance aircraft.
 January 6 – While on approach to Tri-Cities Regional Airport in Bristol, Tennessee, Southeast Airlines Flight 308, a Douglas DC-3A, strays off course and crashes into Holston Mountain, killing all 10 people on board.
 January 11 – Lufthansa Flight 502, a Lockheed L-1049G Super Constellation, crashes just short of the runway on approach to land at Rio de Janeiro–Galeão International Airport in Rio de Janeiro, Brazil, killing 36 of the 39 people on board and leaving all three survivors injured.
 January 18 – A United States Air Force F-100C Super Sabre parked at a secret base somewhere in the Pacific Ocean with a nuclear bomb on board catches fire after its external fuel tanks are dropped and explode during a practice alert. The fire is put out in seven minutes and no nuclear explosion takes place. 
 January 25 – American Airlines begins its first jet service with a Boeing 707 flight between New York, New York, and Los Angeles, California.
 January 31 – The United States deactivates its Ground Observer Corps.

February
 February 3
American Airlines Flight 320, a Lockheed L-188A Electra, crashes into the East River while on approach to New York Citys LaGuardia Airport, killing 65 of the 73 people on board. It is the first fatal accident involving the Electra.
Rock music stars Ritchie Valens, Buddy Holly and The Big Bopper die when the Beechcraft Bonanza they are traveling in crashes during a snow storm in Iowa.
 February 4 – Flying a Cessna 172 Skyhawk (registration N9172B), Robert Timm and John Cook land at McCarran Airfield in Las Vegas, Nevada, after remaining airborne continuously for 64 days 22 hours 19 minutes 5 seconds. The flight sets a new world record for manned flight endurance. They had taken off from McCarran Airfield to begin the flight on December 4, 1958.
 February 17 – A chartered Turkish Airlines Vickers Viscount Type 793 carrying Prime Minister of Turkey Adnan Menderes to London to sign the London Agreement for the constitution of Cyprus strikes trees, loses its wings and engines, and crashes in Jordans Wood in Newdigate, Surrey, England, while on approach to Gatwick Airport. Fourteen of the 24 people on board die, and nine of the 10 survivors are injured. Menderes survives with only minor scratches on his face and signs the agreement two days later in his hospital bed.
 February 20 – The Canadian government cancels the Avro Canada CF-105 Arrow and requires that all nine Arrows completed or under construction be destroyed. The cancellation results from the belief of Canadian politicians that missile technology had made manned interceptor aircraft unnecessary.

March
 March 15 – In the Soviet Union, a commercial jet aircraft, a Tupolev Tu-104 (registration CCCP-42419), takes off from Leningrad′s Shosseynaya Airport (the future Pulkovo Airport) for the first time. Construction work had been undertaken at the airport since the mid-1950s to lengthen its runways so that it could accommodate jet aircraft.
 March 20 – Trans World Airlines initiates its first jet service between San Francisco, California, and New York City, using the Boeing 707-131.
 March 29 – Barthélemy Boganda, the prime minister of the Central African Republic autonomous territory (the future Central African Republic) dies when his plane, a UAT Nord Noratlas, explodes in mid-air over Boukpoyanga, killing all nine people on board.
 March 31 – BOAC commences its first scheduled round-the-world westbound service from London in the United Kingdom via New York City, San Francisco, and Honolulu to Tokyo, Japan, and onward to London.

April
 Kuwait Airways takes over the assets of British International Airlines (BIA).
 April 8 – The Italian World War I ace and famed seaplane racing pilot Mario de Bernardi is performing aerobatics in a light plane over a Rome airport when he begins to experience a heart attack. He lands the plane safely, but dies minutes later at the age of 65.
 April 10 – Six rebels hijack a Compagnie Haitienne de Transports Aériens (COHATA) Douglas DC-3 with 32 people on board during a domestic flight in Haiti from Les Cayes to Port-au-Prince, shoot and kill the pilot, and force the copilot to fly the airliner to Santiago de Cuba in Cuba.
 April 16 – Ten minutes after an Aerovías Cubanas Internacionales airliner (possibly a Curtiss C-46 Commando) with 22 people on board takes off from Havana, Cuba, for a domestic flight to Isla de la Juventud, four men draw guns and force plane to fly to Miami, Florida.
 April 23 – An Air Charter Limited Avro Super Trader IV carrying top-secret equipment from the United Kingdom to the rocket range at Australias Woomera Airfield crashes on Mount Süphan in Turkey, killing all 12 men on board. The wreckage is not found until April 29.
 April 25 – During the last leg of a Miami, Florida-to-Varadero, Cuba-to-Havana, Cuba, flight, two men and two women who had boarded at Varadero hijack a Cubana de Aviación Vickers Viscount with 12 people on board and force it to fly to Key West, Florida.
Spanish gymnastics champion Joaquín Blume and his pregnant wife are among the dead.

May
 May 1 – North Vietnam organizes No. 919 Transport Regiment as the first unit of the Vietnam People's Air Force.
 May 5 – The United States Armys Doak VZ-4 Vertical Takeoff and Landing (VTOL) prototype aircraft transitions from vertical to horizontal flight and vice versa for the first time.
 May 12 – Capital Airlines Flight 75, a Vickers 745D Viscount, breaks apart in severe turbulence and crashes in a rural area near Chase, Maryland, killing all 31 people on board.

June
 June 8
The United States Navy submarine  and the United States Post Office attempt the delivery of mail via Missile Mail.
Continental Airlines inaugurates Boeing 707 service with non-stop flights between Chicago and Los Angeles. 
 June 16 – North Korean Air Force Mikoyan-Gurevich MiG-17s (NATO reporting name "Fresco") attack a United States Navy P4M-1Q Mercator off the coast of North Korea. The Mercators crew returns the aircraft safely to Japan.
 June 30 – A U.S. Air Force North American F-100 Super Sabre fighter suffers an in-flight engine fire over Okinawa. The pilot ejects safely, but the F-100 crashes into Miyamori Elementary School and surrounding houses in Uruma, killing 11 students at the school and six other people in the neighborhood and injuring 210 others, including 156 students at the school.

July
 July 1 – Belgian International Air Services (BIAS) is founded.
 July 6 – A United States Air Force C-124 Globemaster II transporting two nuclear weapons without fissile cores crashes during take-off from Barksdale Air Force Base in Bossier City, Louisiana, and catches fire. The bombs′ high-explosive detonators do not explode and all seven people on board the plane survive, but the aircraft's wreckage and the area surrounding it suffer limited radioactive contamination.
 July 8
A hijacker commandeers a JAT airliner with 27 people on board during a domestic flight in the Socialist Federal Republic of Yugoslavia from Tivat to Beograd and forces it to fly to Bari, Italy.
Belgian International Air Services (BIAS) begins flight operations with a flight between Rotterdam and London.
The Argentine Navy commissions its first aircraft carrier, ARA Independencia (V-1). She is the first aircraft carrier to enter service in Latin America.
 July 9 – A Royal Air Force Vickers Valiant makes the first non-stop flight from England to Cape Town, South Africa.
 July 13 – A start of the Daily Mail race between Marble Arch in London and the Arc de Triomphe in Paris on the 50th anniversary of Louis Blériot's flight (the 1st prize was won by S/L Charles Maughan, in 40 min 44 sec, using a motorcycle, helicopter and Hawker Hunter).
 July 29 – Qantas introduces the Boeing 707 on its Sydney-San Francisco route, the first transpacific service flown by jet.

August
Unable to return to his base at Laughlin Air Force Base in Texas, he glides the U-2 to a deadstick night landing at Cortez Municipal Airport in Cortez, Colorado, ground-looping the U-2 but landing it intact. The U.S. Air Force awards him the Distinguished Flying Cross for the achievement.                 
 August 19 – A Transair Douglas Dakota chartered by the British National Union of Students and carrying 29 British students and a crew of three strays off course and crashes in the Montseny Range in Catalonia, Spain, killing all on board. It is Transairs first accident.
 August 24 – Pan American World Airways inaugurates the first jetliner service between the continental United States and Hawaii, using Boeing 707s.

September
 September 23 – The United States Air Force officially cancels the North American Aviation XF-108 Rapier.
 September 24 – The Transports Aériens Intercontinentaux (TAI) Douglas DC-7C F-BIAP flies into trees while departing Bordeaux–Mérignac Airport, in Mérignac, France, and crashes, killing 54 of the 65 people on board and leaving all 11 survivors injured.
September 25 – A United States Navy P5M Marlin antisubmarine plane carrying an unarmed nuclear depth charge ditches in Puget Sound near Whidbey Island, Washington. The depth charge is not recovered.
 September 29 – Braniff Flight 542, a Lockheed L-188 Electra, disintegrates in mid-air and crashes near Buffalo, Texas, killing all 34 people on board.

October
 Scott Crossfield reaches Mach 2.15 in the second North American X-15, 56-6671.
 October 2 – Three hijackers commandeer a Cubana de Aviación Vickers Viscount with 40 people on board during a domestic flight in Cuba from Havana to Santiago de Cuba and force it to fly to Miami, Florida.
 October 15
A United States Air Force Convair B-58 Hustler flies  in 80 minutes with one refueling, maintaining a speed of more than Mach 2 for more than an hour. The B-58 is the world's first bomber capable of Mach 2 flight.
Two U.S. Air Force aircraft – a B-52F-100-BO Stratofortress bomber with two nuclear bombs on board and a KC-135 Stratotanker – collide in mid-air at an altitude of  during an aerial refueling procedure near Hardinsburg, Kentucky. Both planes crash, killing two of the four crew members aboard the KC-135 and six members of the B-52's crew. The crash of the B-52 damages one unarmed nuclear weapon, but no nuclear contamination results.
 October 30 – The Piedmont Airlines Douglas DC-3 Buckeye Pacemaker, operating as Flight 349, crashes on Bucks Elbow Mountain near Crozet, Virginia, killing 26 of the 27 people on board and seriously injuring the sole survivor, a passenger who is found near the wreckage still strapped into his seat.

November
 November 5 – After suffering an in-flight engine fire, the second North American X-15, 56-6671, piloted by Scott Crossfield, breaks its back making an emergency landing on Rosamond Dry Lake, California.
 November 16 – National Airlines Flight 967, a Douglas DC-7B, crashes in the Gulf of Mexico with the loss of all 42 people on board. An in-flight bombing is suspected but never proven.
 November 21 – Two minutes after takeoff from Beirut, Lebanon, Ariana Afghan Airlines Flight 202, a Douglas DC-4, crashes into the side of a hill at Aramoun, killing 24 of the 27 people on board.

December
 December 2 – During a revolt against President of Brazil Juscelino Kubitschek, Brazilian Air Force officers seize several of the air force's planes and hijack a Panair do Brasil Lockheed L-049 Constellation (registration PP-PCR) with 44 people on board while it is making a domestic flight in Brazil from Rio de Janeiro to Belém. When the revolt fails, they force the Constellation to fly them to Buenos Aires, Argentina.
 December 3 – The Italian airline Società Aerea Mediterranea (SAM), previously active from March 1928 to August 1934, is relaunched as a subsidiary of Alitalia.

First flights 
 Fairchild VZ-5

January
 January 8 – Armstrong Whitworth AW.650 Argosy G-AOZZ
 January 20 – Vickers Vanguard G-AOYW
 January 27 – Convair 880

February
 February 3 – Agusta-Bell AB.102
 February 11 – McDonnell 119
 February 28 – Aérospatiale Alouette III

March
 March 10 – North American X-15 (captive flight; did not detach from its B-52A Stratofortress mothership)
 March 11 – Sikorsky HSS-2 Sea King (redesignated SH-3 Sea King in 1962)
 March 12 – Aero Boero AB-95

April
 April 5 – Aero L-29 Delfín
 April 29 – Dornier Do 28

May
 May 4 – Pilatus PC-6
 May 7 – Procaer Picchio
 May 20 – Max Holste MH.250 Super Broussard

June
 June 5 – Sud-Aviation SA 3200 Frelon
 June 8 – North American X-15 (unpowered glide)
 June 8 – Wassmer WA-40
 June 10 – Morane-Saulnier MS-880
 June 17 – Dassault Mirage IV

July
 July 14 – Sukhoi T-431
 July 30 – Northrop N-156F, prototype of the F-5 Freedom Fighter

September
 September 14 – Beechcraft Debonair
 September 15 – LASA 60 
 September 17 – North American X-15 56-6671 (powered)

October
 Agusta A.103
 October 27 – Myasishchev M-50
 October 29 – Lightning F.1, first operational production model of the English Electric Lightning

November
 November 23 – Boeing 720
 November 24 – Hiller X-18
 November 25 – Lockheed YP3V-1 – First operational prototype.

December
 December 13 – Aviamilano Scricciolo I-MAGY

Entered service 
Sukhoi Su-7 (NATO reporting name "Fitter-A") 
Sukhoi Su-9 (NATO reporting name "Fitter-B" and "Fishpot") with the Soviet Air Defense Forces

February
 Aeritalia G91R with the Italian Air Force

March
 March 26 – Breguet Alizé with the French Naval Aviation.

April
 April 20 – Ilyushin Il-18 with Aeroflot.

May
 Convair F-106 Delta Dart with the United States Air Force′s 498th Fighter-Interceptor Squadron at Geiger Field, Spokane, Washington.

June
 June 12 – Lockheed C-130 Hercules with the U.S. Air Force's 463rd Troop Carrier Wing.

July
 de Havilland Sea Vixen with the Royal Navy's Fleet Air Arm
 North American T2J Buckeye (later T-2 Buckeye) with United States Navy Training Squadron 4 (VT-4)
 July 22
Sud Aviation Caravelle with Air France
Antonov An-10 with Aeroflot

September
 September 18 – Douglas DC-8 with Delta Air Lines and United Air Lines.

December
 GAM-77 Hound Dog air-to-ground cruise missile with United States Air Force Strategic Air Command B-52 Stratofortresses.

References

 
Aviation by year